Lieutenant-Colonel James Farquharson Macleod (c. September 25, 1836 – September 5, 1894), born in Drynoch, Isle of Skye, Scotland, was a militia officer, lawyer, North-West Mounted Police officer, magistrate, judge, and politician in Alberta. He served as the second full Commissioner of the North-West Mounted Police, from July 22, 1876, to October 31, 1880. Fort Macleod and Macleod Trail, a major Calgary, Alberta thoroughfare, are named after him.

In 1887, Macleod was appointed to the Supreme Court of the Northwest Territories, which then included what is now known as Alberta and Saskatchewan. He held this position until his death in 1894. He is buried in Union Cemetery in Calgary.

Education 

Macleod immigrated with his family from Scotland in 1845, when his father purchased a farm at Richmond Hill, Ontario. Macleod attended Upper Canada College in Toronto, Ontario and then Queen's University in Kingston, Ontario. He graduated in 1854 from Queen's with a B.A. in classics and philosophy and then enrolled in 1856 at Osgoode Hall to attend law school. He graduated with an LL.B. in 1860 and articled with the law office of Alexander Campbell. It was also sometime around this time that he joined the Orange Order, L.O.L. 141, as was common of Canadian Ulster-Scots at the time.

Before law school during the summer of 1856, against the wishes of his parents, Macleod joined the Volunteer Militia Field Battery of Kingston as a lieutenant and his enthusiasm was such that his brother-in-law William Augustus Baldwin persuaded Governor General Sir Edmund Walker Head to offer Macleod a commission in the British army. His father insisted that the offer be refused.

Military service 

From 1860 to 1870 Macleod practiced law in Bowmanville, Ontario, but during that time he retained an interest in the militia. He transferred in 1862 to the Bowmanville Volunteer Militia Rifle Company and was promoted to captain in 1863 and major in 1866 when the Bowmanville company became part of the newly formed 45th West Durham Battalion of Infantry. Active service during the Trent Affair in 1861 and the Fenian Raids of 1866 confirmed his interest in the military.

In 1870, he obtained a commission as brigade major with the Wolseley expedition which was sent to quell the Red River Rebellion. After returning from the Red River in 1871, Macleod was promoted to Lieutenant Colonel and became the commanding officer of the 45th West Durham Battalion.

North-West Mounted Police

James served as Commissioner of the NWMP from 1876 to 1880.

Northwest Territories Legislature

James was appointed the Legislative Assembly of Northwest Territories on October 7, 1876, to serve as one of the first three members on the permanent Northwest Territories Council.

He served as a regular appointed member until 1881, when he was appointed as a Stipendiary Magistrate. He served as such until the 1st Northwest Territories general election.

He was reappointed to the Assembly as one of three Legal Advisors, a non-voting at-large position created to help the assembly make the transition. The position was abolished when the legislature was dissolved in 1891, ending 15 years of service with the legislature.

Personal life 
On July 28, 1876, Macleod married pioneer Mary Isabella Drever, who he first met in Spring 1871. They settled in Fort Macleod and had four daughters and one son.

References 

 
Mounted Policemen of Calgary's Cemeteries: James Macleod Retrieved: March 16, 2010

1836 births
1894 deaths
People from the Isle of Skye
People of the Fenian raids
Royal Canadian Mounted Police commissioners
Members of the Legislative Assembly of the Northwest Territories
Upper Canada College alumni
Judges in the Northwest Territories
Scottish emigrants to Canada
Canadian Militia officers